River authorities in the U.S. state of Texas are public agencies established by the state legislature and given authority to develop and manage the waters of the state. These authorities are given powers to conserve, store, control, preserve, utilize, and distribute the waters of a designated geographic region for the benefit of the public.

The 24 Texas river authorities include the following:

 Angelina & Neches River Authority
 Bandera County River Authority and Groundwater District
 Brazos River Authority
 Central Colorado River Authority
 Guadalupe-Blanco River Authority
 Lavaca-Navidad River Authority
 Lower Colorado River Authority
 Lower Neches Valley Authority
 Nueces River Authority
 Palo Duro River Authority
 Red River Authority
 Sabine River Authority
 San Antonio River Authority
 San Jacinto River Authority
 Sulphur River Basin Authority
 Trinity River Authority 
 Upper Colorado River Authority
 Upper Guadalupe River Authority

References

External links 
 Map of River Authorities and Special Law Districts Within the State of Texas, Texas Water Development Board

 
River
river authorities